

Kingdom of Poland and Polish-Lithuanian Commonwealth (966-1795)
See list of kings of Poland for heads of state. In the late 18th century a first proto-government in the modern sense was created in Poland; the Permanent Council.

Cabinets of Duchy of Warsaw (1807-1813)
Government Commission of Stanisław Małachowski
Cabinet of Stanisław Małachowski
Cabinet of Ludwik Szymon Gutakowski
Cabinet of Stanisław Kostka Potocki

Cabinets of Congress Poland (1815-1831)

Cabinets of Kingdom of Poland (1916-1918)
Cabinet of Jan Kucharzewski
Cabinet of Antoni Ponikowski
Cabinet of Jan Kanty Steczkowski
Cabinet of Józef Świeżyński
Cabinet of Władysław Wróblewski

Cabinet of Second Polish Republic (1918-1939)
Cabinet of Ignacy Daszyński
Cabinet of Jędrzej Moraczewski
Cabinet of Ignacy Jan Paderewski
Cabinet of Leopold Skulski
First Cabinet of Władysław Grabski
First Cabinet of Wincenty Witos
First Cabinet of Antoni Ponikowski
Second Cabinet of Antoni Ponikowski
Cabinet of Artur Śliwiński
Cabinet of Julian Ignacy Nowak
First Cabinet of Władysław Sikorski
Second Cabinet of Wincenty Witos
Second Cabinet of Władysław Grabski
Cabinet of Aleksander Skrzyński
Third Cabinet of Wincenty Witos
First Cabinet of Kazimierz Bartel
Second Cabinet of Kazimierz Bartel
Third Cabinet of Kazimierz Bartel
First Cabinet of Józef Piłsudski
Fourth Cabinet of Kazimierz Bartel
Cabinet of Kazimierza Świtalskiego
Fifth Cabinet of Kazimierz Bartel
First Cabinet of Walery Sławek
Second Cabinet of Józef Piłsudski
Second Cabinet of Walery Sławek
Cabinet of Aleksander Prystor
Cabinet of Janusz Jędrzejewicz
Cabinet of Leon Kozłowski
Third Cabinet of Walery Sławek
Cabinet of Marian Zyndram-Kościałkowski
Cabinet of Felicjan Sławój-Składkowski

Cabinets of Polish government in Exile (1939-1990)
Second Cabinet of Władysław Sikorski
Third Cabinet of Władysław Sikorski
Cabinet of Stanisław Mikołajczyk
Cabinet of Tomasz Arciszewski
Cabinet of Tadeusz Komorowski
Cabinet of Tadeusz Tomaszewski
Cabinet of Roman Odzierzyński
Cabinet of Jerzy Hryniewski
Cabinet of Stanisław Mackiewicz
Cabinet of Hugon Hanke
First Cabinet of Antoni Pająk
Second Cabinet of Antoni Pająk
First Cabinet of Aleksander Zawisza
Second Cabinet of Aleksander Zawisza
Third Cabinet of Aleksander Zawisza
Cabinet of Zygmunt Muchniewski
First Cabinet of Alfred Urbański
Second Cabinet of Alfred Urbański
First Cabinet of Kazimierz Sabbat
Second Cabinet of Kazimierz Sabbat
Third Cabinet of Kazimierz Sabbat
Fourth Cabinet of Kazimierz Sabbat
First Cabinet of Edward Szczepanik
Second Cabinet of Edward Szczepanik

Cabinets of Free Poland in Exile (1972-1990)
Alternative government-in-exile, created by Juliusz Nowina-Sokolnicki
Cabinet of Sergiusz Ursyn-Szantyr
Cabinet of Zenon Janasiak
Cabinet of Ryszard Jóżef Zawisza
Cabinet of Stanisław Zięba
Cabinet of Jan Zygmunt Sobolewski
Cabinet of Jan Libront
Cabinet of Jan Alfred Chanerley-Łokcikowski

Cabinets of Polish Republic (1944-1952)
Polski Komitet Wyzwolenia Narodowego
Rząd Tymczasowy Rzeczypospolitej Polskiej
Tymczasowy Rząd Jedności Narodowej
First Cabinet of Józef Cyrankiewicz

Cabinets People's Republic of Poland (1952-1989)
Cabinet of Bolesław Bierut
Second Cabinet of Józef Cyrankiewicz
Third Cabinet of Józef Cyrankiewicz
Fourth Cabinet of Józef Cyrankiewicz
Fifth Cabinet of Józef Cyrankiewicz
First Cabinet of Piotr Jaroszewicz
Second Cabinet of Piotr Jaroszewicz
Cabinet of Edward Babiuch
Cabinet of Józef Pińkowski
Cabinet of Wojciech Jaruzelski
Cabinet of Zbigniew Messner
Cabinet of Mieczysław Rakowski
Cabinet of Czesław Kiszczak

Cabinets Third Polish Republic (1989-)
Cabinet of Tadeusz Mazowiecki
Cabinet of Jan Krzysztof Bielecki
Cabinet of Jan Olszewski
First Cabinet of Waldemar Pawlak
Cabinet of Hanna Suchocka
Second Cabinet of Waldemar Pawlak
Cabinet of Józef Oleksy
Cabinet of Włodzimierz Cimoszewicz
Cabinet of Jerzy Buzek
Cabinet of Leszek Miller
First Cabinet of Marek Belka
Second Cabinet of Marek Belka
Cabinet of Kazimierz Marcinkiewicz
Cabinet of Jarosław Kaczyński
First Cabinet of Donald Tusk
Second Cabinet of Donald Tusk
Cabinet of Ewa Kopacz
Cabinet of Beata Szydło
First Cabinet of Mateusz Morawiecki
Second Cabinet of Mateusz Morawiecki

See also
Prime Minister of the Republic of Poland

 
Political history of Poland
Poland